Louis Guss (January 4, 1918 – September 29, 2008) was an American character actor with a long line of screen credits, having appeared in hundreds of TV series, feature films and stage productions, specializing in blue-collar ethnic roles, over a five decade career. He is perhaps best known for his roles as Don Zaluchi in The Godfather (1972), Joseph Magliocco in Crazy Joe (1974), Raymond Capomaggi in Moonstruck (1987), Nathan Grodner in The Yards (2000), and Jerry "the Hammer" Fungo in The Crew (2000).

His last role was in Sidney Lumet's Find Me Guilty in 2006.

Death
Guss died at the age of 90 in 2008 from natural causes.

Partial filmography

Love with the Proper Stranger (1963) - Flooey (uncredited)
The Godfather (1972) - Don Zaluchi (uncredited)
The Laughing Policeman (1973) - Gus Niles
Crazy Joe (1974) - Magliocco
The Super Cops (1974) - Police Desk Sergeant (uncredited)
Harry and Tonto (1974) - Dominic
Lepke (1975) - Max Rubin
Lucky Lady (1975) - Bernie
No Deposit, No Return (1976) - Freddie
Nickelodeon (1976) - Dinsdale
Fun with Dick and Jane (1977) - Phone Co. Customer
New York, New York (1977) - Frankie Harte Band Member
H.O.T.S. (1979) - Bugs Benny
Willie & Phil (1980) - Mr. D'Amico
Highlander (1986) - Newsvendor
Sno-Line (1986) - Gus
Seize the Day (1986) - Rubin
Vasectomy: A Delicate Matter (1986) - Grandpa Ragon 
Moonstruck (1987) - Raymond Cappomaggi
American Blue Note (1989) - Abe Katz
Slaves of New York (1989) - Vardig
Used People (1992) - Uncle Normy
The Cemetery Club (1993) - Ed Bonfigliano
Night Falls on Manhattan (1996) - Court Clerk
A Wake in Providence (1999) - Uncle Guy
Two Family House (2000) - Donato
Girlfight (2000) - Don
The Yards (2000) - Nathan Grodner
Pedestrian (2000)
The Crew (2000) - Jerry 'The Hammer' Fungo
A Tale of Two Pizzas (2003) - Emilio
Find Me Guilty (2006) - Court Clerk (final film role)

References

External links

1918 births
2008 deaths
Male actors from New York City
American male film actors
American male television actors
American male stage actors
20th-century American male actors